The 1978 Camden Council election took place on 4 May 1978 to elect members of Camden London Borough Council in London, the United Kingdom. The whole council was up for election, using new ward boundaries, with one less councillor than had been elected at the 1974 election.

Labour were re-elected with an outright majority, but the Conservatives made gains across the borough, after losing heavily in the 1971 and 1974 elections. The Conservatives gained from Labour three seats in the southern Holborn and St Pancras South parliamentary constituency and eleven in the north (three in the Highgate ward and eight across the Hampstead parliamentary constituency).

Election result

Ward results

Adelaide

Belsize

Bloomsbury

Brunswick

Camden

Castlehaven

Caversham

Chalk Farm

Fitzjohns

Fortune Green

Frognal

Gospel Oak

Grafton

Hampstead Town

Highgate

Holborn

Kilburn

King's Cross

Priory

Regent's Park

St John's

St Pancras

Somers Town

South End

Swiss Cottage

West End

References

 

1978
1978 London Borough council elections